The TMU Bold women's basketball (formerly Ryerson Rams) team represents Toronto Metropolitan University in the Ontario University Athletics conference of U Sports women's basketball. The Rams have won one national championship following their victory in the 2022 tournament.

History
The Ryerson Rams women's basketball team  had their most successful era between 2012-2020. Led by Canada women's national basketball team assistant coach Carly Clarke the Rams went 109-57 between 2012 and 2020.

With the arrival of Clarke, she led the Rams into the OUA playoffs in her inaugural season. The 2014-15 season saw the greatest season in Rams history up to that time. Finishing with a program-record 16 wins, compared to only three losses, the Rams qualified for the Critelli Cup championship game, also qualifying for the Canadian Interuniversity Sport (now U Sports) Final 8 Tournament.

The following season (2015-2016), the Rams matched their 16-win total. In what proved to be the Rams most successful season, they were led by OUA Player of the Year, OUA Defensive Player of the Year and CIS National Player of the Year Keneca Pingue-Giles, capturing their first Critelli Cup defeating the Ottawa Gee-Gees 66-60. At the 2016 CIS Women's Basketball Championship, the Ryerson Rams reached the National Final before falling to the Saskatchewan Huskies in the final 85-71.

The 2016 Critelli Cup triumph was the first provincial championship won by any program in Ryerson Rams athletics history. At the Final 8 Tournament, the Rams qualified for the gold medal game, marking the first Rams team to appear in a national championship final. In January 2016, the Rams reached No. 2 in the national rankings, an historic first.

Heading into 2016-17, the Rams welcomed Kellie Ring, a fifth-year transfer player. Additionally, the Rams’ lineup saw a pair of players, Emma Fraser and Bronwyn Williams, qualify for the OUA All-Rookie team.

The Ryerson Rams hosted the 2019 U Sports Women's Basketball Championship at Mattamy Athletic Centre in Toronto, a season that saw the Rams reach the OUA Playoffs for the twelfth straight season, finishing the tournament in 5th place.

Reaching 18 wins in 2019-20, the Rams hosted the Brock Badgers women's basketball team in the Critelli Cup championship game. Additionally, the Rams qualified for the 2020 U SPORTS Women's Basketball Final 8 National Championship.in 2020 falling to the Brock Badgers 84-71. In March 2020, Rams basketball alum Keneca Pingue-Giles was named to the list of the Top 100 U Sports Women’s Basketball Players of the Century (2011-2020).

U Sports Elite 8 results

Individual leader scoring

International
Carly Clarke Coach:  2011 FIBA Americas U16 Championship, 2012 and 2014 FIBA U17 World Championship; 2020 Tokyo Olympics Asst. Coach
Mariah Nunes : 2017 Summer Universiade
Kellie Ring : 2017 Summer Universiade 
Jama Bin-Edward:  2019 Winter Universiade

Awards and honors

OUA Awards
 2017-18 OUA Rookie of the Year Marin Scotten
2017 OUA All-Star Game participant: Nicole DiDomenico
 2015-16 OUA Most Valuable Player: Keneca Pingue-Giles
 2015-16 OUA Defensive Player of the Year: Keneca Pingue-Giles
 2012-13 OUA East Rookie of the Year : Cassandra Nofuente

OUA All-Stars
2016-17 First Team: Sofia Paska
2016-17 First Team: Kellie Ring
2015-16 First Team: Keneca Pingue-Giles

OUA All-Rookie
2016-17 OUA All-Rookie Team: Bronwyn Williams – Ryerson Rams
2016-17 OUA All-Rookie Team: Emma Fraser – Ryerson Rams
 2012-13 OUA East All-Rookie: Cassandra Nofuente

Joy Bellinger Award
2016-17 OUA Joy Bellinger Award: Nicole DiDomenico – Ryerson Rams  presented annually to the student-athlete who excels in academics, athletics, and community service for her time in the local community
 2006–07 Joy Bellinger Award of Merit : Lisa Greig
 2003–04 Joy Bellinger Award of Merit: Ashley Keohan

U Sports Awards
Note: U Sports was formerly known as Canadian Interuniversity Sport (CIS), and prior to that, the Canadian Interuniversity Athletic Union (CIAU).
2015-16 Nan Copp Award: Keneca Pingue-Giles
1990-1991 CIS Rookie of the Year: Darcel Wright

U Sports All-Canadians
First Team
 Keneca Pingue-Giles - CIS First Team All-Canadian (2015-2016)

Second Team
 Sofia Paska - U Sports Second Team All-Canadian (2017-2018)
 Sofia Paska - U Sports Second Team All-Canadian (2016-2017)

U Sports All-Rookie
 Marrin Scotten - U Sports All-Rookie Team (2017-2018)
 Cassandra Nofuente - CIS All-Rookie Team (2012-2013)
 Mandi-May Bond - CIS All-Rookie Team (1998-1999)

References 

Toronto Metropolitan University
U Sports women's basketball teams
Sports teams in Toronto
Women in Ontario